The 1983 BC Lions finished in first place in the West Division with an 11–5 record. They appeared in the Grey Cup but lost to the Toronto Argonauts.

Offseason

CFL Draft

Preseason

Regular season

Season standings

Season schedule

Awards and records
 Rick Klassen: Dick Suderman Trophy

1983 CFL All-Stars
 OT – John Blain, CFL All-Star
 P/K – Lui Passaglia, CFL All-Star
 DT – Mack Moore, CFL All-Star
 DB – Kerry Parker, CFL All-Star
 DB – Larry Crawford, CFL All-Star

Playoffs

West Final

Grey Cup

References

BC Lions seasons
N. J. Taylor Trophy championship seasons
1983 Canadian Football League season by team
1983 in British Columbia